The Economic Growth of Brazil is a book of Brazilian economist Celso Furtado, published in 1959.

The book was written in a time of optimism in Brazil: it was the end of the government of Juscelino Kubitschek, considered one of the most democratic and its slogan "fifty years in five" will promote an outbreak of development, the example of the automobile industry that will eventually settle and initiatives for the promotion of growth, such as new roads and the creation of Sudene (Superintendency for the Development of the Northeast).

See also 
Sudene

References

External links 
Editora Companhia das letras: excerpts of commemorative edition of 50 years of work

1959 non-fiction books
Brazilian non-fiction books